Dangerous Ground is a large area in the southeast part of the South China Sea characterized by many low islands and cays, sunken reefs, and atolls awash, with reefs often rising abruptly from ocean depths greater than .

There are few precise definitions, but Dangerous Ground corresponds roughly to the seas around the eastern half of the Spratly Islands. It is an oblong area running southwest to northeast for about 340 nautical miles (nm) (630 km), 175 nm (324 km) at its widest, with an area of about 52,000 nm² (178,000 km2). It is west of Palawan island and northwest of the Palawan Passage.

The area is poorly charted, making it exceptionally dangerous to navigate – the major Singapore-to-Hong-Kong routes go well to the west and east of the area. The Admiralty Sailing Directions  give the following warning regarding navigation in this area:
Due to the conflicting dates and accuracy of the various partial surveys of Dangerous Ground, certain shoals and reefs may appear on one chart, but not on another regardless of the scales involved.Charted depths and their locations may present considerable error in the lesser known regions of this area. Avoidance of Dangerous Ground is the mariner’s only assurance of safety.

Boundaries 
The boundary of Dangerous Ground is shown on NGA charts 93044 (NW), 93045 (NE), 93046 (most of the SE), and 93047 (SW).  (The missing portion of the SE is covered by 93048 and the top corner of 92006.)

The area is described in NGA Pub. 161, Sailing Directions (Enroute) South China Sea and the Gulf of Thailand. The navigational charts and sailing directions do not completely agree with each other as to the boundary. For example, the Sailing Directions include most of the NW area shown on Chart 93044 as outside of Dangerous ground, but exclude the Reed Bank, which is shown on Chart 93045 as inside Dangerous Ground.

Both publications divide the area into four quadrants - NW, NE, SE and SW:

NW
Chart 93044 – approx. 10–12°N, 113–115°E; Sailing Directions pp8–10.
1.21 North Danger Reef – northern and western sections
 North Reef, North Pass, Northeast Cay, Shira Islet, Middle Pass, Southwest Cay, West Pass (N), Jenkins Patches, West Pass (S)
1.22 North Danger Reef – southern and eastern sections; Trident & Lys Shoals
 South Reef, South Pass, Sabine Patches, Farquharson Patches, East Pass, Day Shoal, Iroquois Ridge; Trident Shoal, Lys Shoal
1.23 Thitu Reefs and surrounding
 Thitu Island, Subi Reef
1.24 Loaita Bank
 Loaita Island, Lankiam Cay
1.25 & 1.26 Tizard Bank
 Namyit Island, Gaven Reefs, Sand Cay, Itu Aba Island, Petley Reef, Eldad Reef
1.26 West of Tizard Bank
 Western Reef, Discovery Great Reef, Discovery Small Reef

NE
Chart 93045 – approx. 10–12°N, 115–117°E; Sailing Directions pp10–11.
1.27 East of Loaita Bank 
 Menzies Reef, Irving Reef, West York Island
1.27 Southampton Reefs (East of Tizard Bank) 
 Hopps Reef, Livock Reef 
 Northern NE – Reed Bank
 Nares Bank, Marie Louise Bank
1.27 & 1.28 Central NE
 Jackson Atoll, Nanshan Island, Flat Island, Third Thomas Shoal, Hopkins Reef, Amy Douglas, Hirane Shoal, Hardy Reef
1.29 Eastern NE 
Sandy Shoal, Seahorse Shoal, Lord Auckland Shoal, Carnatic Shoal

SE
Chart 93046 – approx. 8–10°N, 115–117°E; Sailing Directions pp11–12.
1.30 & 1.31 Eastern SE
Half Moon Shoal, Bombay Reef, Royal Captain Shoal
1.32 Central SE
Sabina Shoal, Boxall Reef, Second Thomas Shoal
1.33 & 1.34 Western SE
Mischief Reef, First Thomas Shoal, Alicia Annie Reef

SW
Chart 93047 – approx. 8–10°N, 113–115°E; Sailing Directions pp12–13.
1.34 & 1.35 Union Bank
Johnson Reef, Collins Reef, Sin Cowe Island, Whitsun Reef, Grierson Reef, Lansdowne Reef, 
1.36 Central SW
Bittern Reef, Allison Reef, Cornwallis South Reef
1.37
Pearson Reef, Pigeon Reef, Commodore Reef
1.38 
Investigator Shoal, Ardasier Reef, Ardasier Bank
1.39
Erica Reef, Mariveles Reef, Dallas Reef, Barque Canada Reef.

Outside of Dangerous Ground

Sailing Directions pp13–15.
Other parts of the Spratly Islands which are not inside Dangerous Ground include:
1.41 – 1.43 West of Dangerous Ground
 Fiery Cross Reef, London Reefs, Spratly Island 
1.44 – 1.48 South West and South of Dangerous Ground
Amboyna Cay, Southwest Bank, Rifleman Bank, Swallow Reef

Territorial disputes

The sovereignty of many of the islands is disputed, as are economic claims.

Notes

References

Further reading
 C.S. Hutchison, V.R. Vijayan, "What are the Spratly Islands?" Journal of Asian Earth Sciences 39:371–385, 2010 PDF
 David Hancox, Victor Prescott, "A Geographical Description of the Spratly Islands and an Account of Hydrographic Surveys Amongst Those Islands", Maritime Briefing (University of Durham) 1:6, 1995,  full text

Territorial disputes of the Philippines
Territorial disputes of China
Territorial disputes of Malaysia
Territorial disputes of Vietnam
Territorial disputes of the Republic of China
South China Sea
Marginal seas of the Pacific Ocean
Disputed territories in Southeast Asia

Seas of Asia